Zahed Sultan is a multimedia artist, culture producer, filmmaker, and social entrepreneur of Kuwaiti-Indian heritage based in London. He has performed and presented his work internationally. Sultan is particularly known for his live audio-visual-dance performances.

Music

Career beginnings 
Sultan began his career as a teenager, DJing for both mixed and segregated parties in Kuwait. During his time in college, he worked as a promoter for nightclubs around Boston, MA (US). Sultan wrote his first track using a PC and an analog Roland sampler to program and sequence the song. Several years later, he created a small body of work entitled illusive for a local exhibition in Kuwait and won 3rd place in DJ Sasha's Involver remix competition with Global Underground and Ableton. Sultan's remix was later signed by Sasha's label Xpander to the TV series Crime Scene Investigation (CSI).

Releases 
Sultan released his debut album Hi Fear, Lo Love in 2011. Its first single, "I Saw Her, I Fell For Her" was licensed to the movie 11.6 directed by Philippe Godeau. Its second single, "I Want Her But I Don't Want Her" was featured on Stephane Pompougnac's internationally acclaimed Hôtel Costes, Vol. 15 compilation becoming the first modern track from the Persian Gulf area to be featured on a global music compilation. MTV Iggy featured Sultan's third single "Walkin Away" and highlighted Sultan as an emerging artist from the Middle East. The album was followed up by a string of remixes by emerging artists.

In 2012, Sultan released an EP titled Reuse Me for an eco-friendly exhibition he organizes in Kuwait called REUSE. The song "Like This" from the EP won favorable reviews by a number of online magazines and blogs such as The East / West Sound. In 2013, Sultan was also featured on O2 Academy TV in London, UK.

In 2014, Sultan released "Ghazi", the first single from his sophomore album eyeamsound which provided a glimpse into the alternative electronic sound of the record. A second single, "Democrazy", followed in 2015, and the album was released worldwide that summer. Musically, Sultan describes the songs on the album as having «a lot of texture and body to them». On the album, Sultan mostly sings in Arabic and English. With titles like "Bedoon", the third single inspired by the life of stateless people in Kuwait, Sultan took a distinctively more socio-political route. Music from the album was featured on Hype Machine and a short film released by Red Bull highlighted his sound and live performance format. «Strengthening Sultan’s rapidly increasing discography», in 2016 he released the single "Cake & Butter". «Venturing into the alt-rock genre in his own unique way,» Sultan's vocals on the song «bear some resemblance to the Lizard King himself, The Doors’ Jim Morrison.»

In 2017, Sultan released the Hiwar Sessions EP which featured dub and experimental remixes of heritage pearl-diving songs by emerging producers from Kingston, Ramallah, Beirut, and Bombay. In 2018, Sultan released another EP to support his first music documentary film, Vibrations. He recorded the EP at Bob Marley's Tuff Gong Studio in Kingston, Jamaica with young musicians from the Reggae and Dancehall scenes. The EP featured two single releases, "Mama Bamba" (2017) and "Monkey Riddim" (2018).

In 2020, Sultan released "Layl", a cinematic «homage to the 70s disco song "Do You Love Me" by Lebanese group The Bendaly Family […] taking a darker and more sombre path, the song took on a deeper meaning of love and loss». Soon after, Sultan released "Ana", a folk-pop song that reimagines the legendary singer and late poet from the Western Sahara, Mariem Hassan’s song "Arrabi al Arabe". Sultan adds beats, percussions, and synths and sings with Mariem in Arabic to build on calls of freedom and unity. In a follow up to "Ana", Sultan released "Hindi Majnoon" in 2021, a pop-nostalgia song and music video about being bullied for being half-Indian while growing up in Kuwait.

In an interview with London Live, Sultan described his music as «alternative electronic», using live instrumentation as well as electronic music to «fuse those worlds in a live scenario [and blur] the lines between analog and digital». Sultan's music and performance style continues to evolve using a cross-disciplinary approach.

Live Performance 
Sultan puts a great focus on collaboration, in the studio and when performing live. He has worked with emerging and established artists from around the world, including Europe, Asia and North America on various multimedia projects.

In 2015, Sultan was part of Doug Aitken's Station to Station: A 30 Day Happening at the Barbican Centre in London, UK for the Shubbak Festival. During a short on-site residency at the Gallery, Sultan created an «immersive experience», drawing from past live performances and music supported by artists from different disciplines. That same year, The Vinyl Factory released a short film of the project.

Another project that highlights Sultan's live performance style is his project Hiwar which reimagines traditional pearl-diving music from the Persian Gulf region. Hiwar was developed in Sharjah in 2016 and then reproduced in Dubai in 2017, to kick off the inaugural RBMA Weekender in the Arab region. Sultan also premiered a short film related to the project, alongside an in-depth interview with RBMA discussing "the utilitarian purpose of pearl-diving music, the evolution of related forms in the Persian Gulf and how to celebrate cultural diversity without being a purist. That same year, Zahed was commissioned to re-imagine and perform land, mountain and sea music from Oman supported by local and international artists.  Boiler Room 4:3 released a short film about the project in 2018. The film was also included in 'The Place I Call Home' exhibition which toured cities in the UK and Persian Gulf from 2019 - 2020. Sultan continues to develop and perform Hiwar in various audio, visual and dance formats in the Middle East, North Africa, UK  and Europe.

In 2019, Sultan performed a Soundbath project in London to "explore the potentiality for electronic music to be a source of healing."

Music Production 
In addition to his own projects, Sultan has worked as a music producer for Saudi Arabian singer / songwriter tamtam, on her debut single / remixes EP Little Girl  in 2012 and her Games EP in 2014.

In 2017, Sultan contributed to composer and conceptual-artist Fatima Al Qadiri's EP Shaneera as the vocals tracking engineer for the album at his recording studio in Kuwait, contributing to ″a safe space where they could be at ease″.

In 2020, Sultan produced two songs "CONTROL" and "WAYWTD" for Yemeni/British artist intibint's debut EP What Are You Willing To Do.

Film 
Having released music videos and short films between 2011 and 2017, Sultan completed his first documentary film Vibrations in 2018 which he co-directed and executive produced. The film follows Sultan's journey as he re-imagines heritage music from Kuwait in the form of a cultural exchange with young musicians in Kingston, Jamaica while emphasizing the role social and political challenges played in forming a vibrant, creative community in the country today. Vibrations received special screenings in London and Kuwait in 2018, each included a short performance and q&a with the audience. Vibrations was also screened in film festivals and independent cinemas from 2018 - 2019 and received awards at the Scandinavian International Film Festival and Houston International Film and Video Festival and official selections by the Brighton Rocks Film Festival and Amsterdam International Filmmaker Festival.

Sultan continues to release short films through his work in live performance and culture.

Culture 

While developing his music career, Sultan has put an emphasis on environmental awareness. This can be traced back to an exhibition he created in 2007 called REUSE which promoted eco-friendly living through art. Various editions of the exhibition featured up and coming talents from Kuwait through to renowned international artists such as Hassan Hajjaj and Jose Gonzalez. In 2016, Sultan redirected the exhibition's focus "to create a space for artists and audiences to interact using digital media, with an emphasis on light, sound and physical performance." REUSE was presented in Dubai in 2017 and most recently at The Scientific Center in Kuwait in 2019 to "offer people the opportunity to investigate and make their own decisions about complex environmental issues."

In 2019, Sultan was honored with the HSSE Award by Kuwait Integrated Petroleum Industries Company (KIPIC) for his work in striving to raise eco-awareness in the region. "It's about [nurturing] a kind of citizen who is aware of their imprint on the system" says Sultan.

Sultan has also been referred to as "Kuwait's one man music industry" and "the man single-handedly pushing it forward". In 2014, he compiled a soundscape for a travelling design exhibition Islamopolitan that featured contemporary music from the Middle East which showed in Sharjah, Istanbul, Milan and Kuwait. In 2015, Sultan created the Kuwait Rising music festival with Red Bull to feature emerging music from the Arab world and beyond. Over the years, the festival has hosted artists from South Asia, MENA, Europe, UK and US such as Joss Stone and HVOB. The festival faced public backlash in 2019 when Lebanese band Mashrou' Leila was invited to perform "on the basis that they 'promote homosexuality' which is strongly condemned." In 2017, Sultan was invited by UK music blog Stamp The Wax to create a City Guide to his favorite places in Kuwait along with a music mix of emerging talent from the country. "Zahed is helping grow Kuwait's unique underground music scene and put the Arab city on the international alternative music scene's map." In 2020, Sultan introduced a new rhythm and poetry series called G.O.A.T to highlight artists shaping culture and society.

Sultan is «not afraid to express himself through drastically different means and mediums». In London, he has taken an interest "in creating a space for people who come from communities with marginalized voices to come together". He developed a residency program and multi-arts festival in 2019 called Haramacy to amplify Middle Eastern and South Asian voices in the city. Acting as a catalyst for cross-cultural engagement, Haramacy creates a safe space for artists to explore intersectional social systems (race, gender, class and ethnicity) that exist within their communities. Adding to its activities in 2020, Haramacy «is also organizing talks and a publication that dive deeper into the subjects tackled by the [residency] program and festival». On completion of the «bold collection of necessary stories ranging from LGBTQ+ topics to race, culture, and faith», Sultan signed the book to an international crowdfunded publishing company in the UK, Unbound. In the same year, Sultan founded COMMUN to bring his culture projects together under one umbrella "with an overarching theme of community-building, touching upon more than one sense at a time." In 2021, COMMUN introduced an affordable subscription service via their website; offering grants, courses, videos, and more to share their learnings and bring people closer to the personal stories and practices of BIPOC voices.

Sultan also takes part in conferences to share his work and experiences with a wider audience. In 2016 Sultan was a panelist at the C/O Pop Festival in Cologne, Germany, discussing Cultural Entrepreneurship and how to learn from the creative music industry. In the same year, Sultan presented a performance talk at the Nuqat conference in Kuwait entitled The Institute of the Future. In 2017, Sultan presented a talk at the STEP Music Conference in Dubai on the inspiration behind his traditional pearl diving music project, Hiwar. In 2019, Sultan travelled to Sydney, Australia to participate on two panels at EMC, Middle East and North Africa's Electronic Revolution and Systemic Shift: Taking Sustainability from Buzz Word to Reality. In 2021, Sultan participated as a board member for the inaugural MDLBEAST XP music conference in Riyadh, Saudi Arabia and as a panelist on Music and Film: Exploring Beyond the Red Sea.

Social Impact 

In 2008, Sultan co-founded en.v, an organization that mobilizes and connects change-makers to effectively and collaboratively address community challenges, with the long-term goal of fostering a more compassionate, innovative and sustainable society. As part of its mission to enhance the impact of the civic sector in Kuwait, en.v creates inclusive spaces for members of the community to come together, share knowledge, increase coordination and spark collaborations, "to make citizens aware of their mark on society." "en.v has a number of programs that aim to influence Kuwaiti society for the better," through ongoing data collection and analysis, the organization responds to the needs and aspirations of local change-makers and "offers a forum for ideas and opinions, bravely touching upon issues considered taboo or rarely mentioned in Middle Eastern countries".

One such example is a program called AWAKEN which brings people together from different backgrounds to think creatively about social issues in Kuwait. Through activities such as a community building festival and participatory discussions, AWAKEN'''s goal is "to create an inclusive space for people from diverse sections of society where they can have their voices heard". In an effort to bring out stories hidden in the shadows, in 2020, en.v launched Neighbourhood Tales: Kuwait Under Lockdown'' to document the experiences of people living in Kuwait during the COVID-19 pandemic, focusing on «the communities that were being affected the most» with a «dignified collection of first-hand stories from people across different neighbourhoods, socioeconomic groups and cultures».

Personal life 
Sultan's father, Ghazi Sultan, is from Kuwait and studied at Harvard University under Bauhaus founder Walter Gropius and went on to co-found one of the largest architectural firms in the Middle East, KEO International Architects. He also co-founded a leading gallery for modern Arab art, Sultan Gallery. His mother, Aruna Sultan, is from India and is a landscape designer, «who championed the right of women to work onboard Air India at a time when the profession was considered disreputable». Sultan has two brothers, Nader Sultan and Tahir Sultan.

Discography

Filmography

References

External links 
 Official website

Kuwaiti artists
Kuwaiti musicians
Social entrepreneurs
Year of birth missing (living people)
Living people